Alessio Bernabei (born September 4, 1992) is an Italian singer.

Early life 
Bernabei was born in Tarquinia. He formed his first band at the age of 14.

Dear Jack 
In 2012, Bernabei founded the band Dear Jack with Francesco Pierozzi, Lorenzo Cantarini, Alessandro Presti and Riccardo Ruiu. In 2015, he departed the band to start a solo career.

Solo career 
After departing Dear Jack in 2015, Bernabei signed a contract with Warner Music Italy.

Bernabei has recorded two solo albums - Noi siamo infinito in 2016 and Senza filtri in 2018, as well as many singles.

He has participated at Sanremo Music Festival on three occasions. His first participation was in 2015 with Dear Jack and the song Il mondo episode, coming 7th in the Big Artists final. Bernabei returned as a soloist in 2016 with the song Noi siamo infinito, which finished 14th in the Big Artists final. His most recent participation was in 2017 with the song 'Nel mezzo di un applauso', which came 15th in the Big Artists final.

He was nominated as Favorite Italian Singer at the 2016 and 2017 Kids' Choice Awards.

Discography 

Albums
 2016 – Noi siamo infinito
 2018 – Senza filtri

Singles
 2016 – Noi siamo infinito
 2016 – Io e te = la soluzione
 2016 – Due giganti
 2017 – Nel mezzo di un applauso
 2017 – Non è il Sudamerica
 2018 – Ti ricordi di me?
 2018 – Messi e Ronaldo
 2020 – Trinidad
 2021 – Everest

References

21st-century Italian singers
Living people
1992 births